Niko Kovač (born 15 October 1971) is a Croatian professional football coach and former player. He is currently the manager of Bundesliga club VFL Wolfsburg.

Kovač was the long-standing captain of the Croatia national team until his retirement from international football in January 2009. A defensive midfielder who was known for his excellent passing and tackling skills, Kovač was, at the time of his retirement, the oldest player in the Croatian squad and had captained them at the 2006 FIFA World Cup and UEFA Euro 2008. He has also enjoyed a high level of top club action, having spent most of his club career in the German Bundesliga, including spells with Hertha BSC, Bayer Leverkusen, Hamburger SV and Bayern Munich.

He ended his playing career with Austrian club Red Bull Salzburg, where he then took the non-playing role of the reserve team coach and eventually became assistant manager under team manager Ricardo Moniz. In January 2013, Kovač took over the Croatia national under-21 team and in October 2013 he took over the Croatia senior team following the dismissal of Igor Štimac. Kovač managed Croatia at the 2014 FIFA World Cup, then became head coach of Eintracht Frankfurt in 2016, winning the 2018 DFB-Pokal Final with the club. At Bayern, Kovač won the domestic double in 2019 after a strong ending to the season, but lost his job later in autumn. In the summer of 2020, Kovač was appointed manager of Monaco, but was sacked on 1 January 2022.

Club career

Early career (1987–1996)
Kovač started training football as an eight-year old with Rapide Wedding in Berlin. After that he joined Hertha Zehlendorf and soon became a member of the first team. He moved to Hertha BSC in 1991 and started his professional career with the club that competed in the 2. Bundesliga at the time.

During his youth, Kovač in parallel with football practised judo, earning the blue belt. After finishing high school (gymnasium) he continued his education at Free University of Berlin. He pursued a degree in business studies while playing for Hertha BSC. After eight semesters, he left university when he secured a contract with Bayer Leverkusen.

Bayer Leverkusen (1996–1999)
In the summer of 1996, Kovač left Hertha, still a 2. Bundesliga side at the time, for Bundesliga side Bayer Leverkusen. He made his Bundesliga debut on 17 August 1996, appearing as a half-time substitute in the club's opening match of the 1996–97 season, a 4–2 home victory over Borussia Dortmund. He appeared in 32 Bundesliga matches in his first season with Leverkusen, also scoring three goals. However, he mostly played as a substitute in the following two seasons and missed several matches in the 1997–98 season after sustaining an injury in the club's home match against VfB Stuttgart in December 1997. In three seasons with Bayer Leverkusen, Kovač made 77 Bundesliga appearances and scored eight goals in league competition. At the club, he was teammates with his younger brother Robert for the first time in his professional career.

Hamburger SV (1999–2001)
Kovač joined Hamburger SV in the summer of 1999 and spent two seasons with the club, making 55 Bundesliga appearances and scoring 12 goals in the Bundesliga.

Bayern Munich (2001–2003)
In July 2001, Kovač signed for then Bundesliga and UEFA Champions League winners, Bayern Munich. Kovač joined the club along with his brother, Robert. However, Kovač did not manage to establish himself as a regular at the club and left Bayern for a second stint with Hertha BSC after two seasons in the summer of 2003. He appeared in 34 Bundesliga matches and scored three goals for Bayern in the league.

Hertha BSC (2003–2006)
Kovač then signed for Hertha again. He made 75 Bundesliga appearances for the club and scored eight goals in the league.

Red Bull Salzburg (2006–2009)

After the 2006 FIFA World Cup, Kovač left Hertha after three seasons for Austrian Bundesliga side Red Bull Salzburg. He was a regular in the Salzburg team and also appeared in all of their four UEFA Champions League qualifiers in the summer of 2006. On 26 August 2006, he scored his first goal for Red Bull Salzburg in the Bundesliga, netting the second goal in their 4–0 home victory over Wacker Tirol. He signed one more year until summer 2009 in May 2008. On 29 May 2009, Kovač left after three years with Red Bull and retired from professional football. He played his last match for Red Bull in a friendly against former club Bayern Munich; he was substituted off after the first 15 minutes.

International career
Kovač made his senior international debut in Croatia's friendly match against Morocco on 11 December 1996 in Casablanca. He subsequently also appeared in three qualifying matches for the 1998 FIFA World Cup, but missed the finals in France because he did not fully recover from injury until the beginning of the preparations for the tournament. He was subsequently not part of the national team for two years before making his comeback in a friendly match against France in November 1999.

At international level, Kovač played for Croatia in five qualifying matches for the 2002 World Cup and scored one goal in Croatia's 4–0 victory away against San Marino. At the final tournament, he appeared as a starting player in all three group matches before Croatia was eliminated from the tournament with a third-place finish in their group. He was also a regular in UEFA Euro 2004 qualifying, making seven appearances and scoring two goals in away matches, the 1–0 winner against Estonia and the opening goal in the team's 3–0 victory over Andorra. He also played the entire three group matches played by the Croatian team at the final Euro 2004 tournament in Portugal and scored the opening goal in the final group match against England. However, Croatia lost the match 4–2 and was once again eliminated from the tournament as the third-placed nation in its group.

After Euro 2004, Kovač became the Croatia national team's captain and led the team through the qualifying campaign for the 2006 FIFA World Cup finals in Germany. He appeared in nine of ten qualifying matches and scored two goals, both in Croatia's 4–0 victory over Iceland at home in Zagreb. At the final tournament, he appeared in all three of Croatia's group matches, despite sustaining an injury which forced him to leave the pitch after 40 minutes of the team's opening match against Brazil. Kovač scored the goal that put Croatia 2–1 up in the final group match against Australia. However, the match ended in a 2–2 draw and Croatia was eliminated by virtue of finishing third in the group. This was the third consecutive time this had happened in a major tournament.

Euro 2008 was a bittersweet campaign for captain Kovač. His sterling performances against Germany and Turkey ultimately unrewarded in what could prove to be his last major tournament. Against Germany, he was peerless, producing a man of the match display alongside Luka Modrić whilst against Turkey, he reduced his opponents to pot shots from distance as they rarely broke through his screening protection of the back four. Before and after that game, Kovač reiterated his intention to retire from international football at the end of Euro 2008, however, after conversation with Slaven Bilić, it would seem he feels there is "unfinished business" to take care of.

Kovač finally announced his international retirement on 7 January 2009, stating a desire that younger players should be given experience in the Croatia side.

Managerial career

Red Bull Salzburg (2009–2011)

After his retirement from professional football, Kovač became coach of the second squad of FC Red Bull Salzburg, Red Bull Juniors, from 16 June 2009 to 7 April 2011. In the 2009–10 season, he finished in sixth place and were knocked out in the Austrian Cup in the second round in a shootout. He was with the second team until 7 April 2011. His final match was a 1–1 draw against SV Seekirchen. In 2011, he was promoted to being assistant coach of the first squad together with Ricardo Moniz as head coach. After Moniz resigned as a first-team coach in June 2012, Kovač was one of the favourites for taking his position. However, the position went to Roger Schmidt and Kovač subsequently left Salzburg.

Croatia (2013–2015)

Under-21
On 21 January 2013, Igor Štimac, head coach of the Croatia national team, announced that Kovač, alongside his brother Robert as assistant coach, would take over as the under-21 team head coach. His task was to qualify for the 2015 UEFA European Under-21 Championship. Croatia were drawn in Group 5 of the qualifying competition, together with Switzerland, Ukraine, Latvia and Liechtenstein. In the first four games Croatia got the maximum of 12 points with a goal difference of 13–0. He debuted with a 5–0 away win against Liechtenstein, before he brought two away wins against the group favourites Ukraine and Switzerland.

Senior

On 16 October 2013, Davor Šuker, president of the Croatian Football Federation (HNS), announced that Niko Kovač would take over as caretaker manager of the Croatia senior team. He replaced Štimac, who was sacked after Croatia scraped into the World Cup play-offs having taken only one point from their last four qualifiers. However, one day later, in an inaugural press conference, Šuker stated HNS signed a two-year contract with Kovač and his staff including his brother Robert Kovač, Vatroslav Mihačić and Goran Lacković, until the end of Croatia's UEFA Euro 2016 campaign. His first two matches for Croatia were in the World Cup play-offs against Iceland. Croatia managed to qualify for the 2014 FIFA World Cup in Brazil after winning the play-off tie against Iceland 2–0 on aggregate. At the World Cup, Croatia won 4–0 against Cameroon and lost 3–1 against Brazil and Mexico. Croatia did not qualify from their group. On 9 September 2015, HNS terminated Kovač's contract after Croatia lost 2–0 to Norway in the UEFA Euro 2016 qualifying.

Eintracht Frankfurt (2016–2018)
Kovač was appointed as head coach of Eintracht Frankfurt on 8 March 2016. He made his managerial debut for Frankfurt in a 3–0 loss to Borussia Mönchengladbach. The club was only able to finish the season in 16th place, requiring them to play in the relegation play-offs against 1. FC Nürnberg. After drawing the first leg 1–1 at home, Kovač ensured Eintracht's survival in the Bundesliga after Haris Seferovic's goal won the second leg 1–0. Kovač received a Fair Play Prize from the DOSB for his gesture of comforting Nürnberg's players after their defeat.

In the 2016–17 season, Frankfurt managed to finish mid-table in 11th position, as well as notably reaching the 2017 DFB-Pokal Final, club's first final since 2006, where Frankfurt lost 1–2 against Borussia Dortmund. In the 2017–18 season, Frankfurt competed for a place in European competition for the following season. Kovač has typically used a 3–4–2–1 formation with emphasis on defensive stability and wing play. He took Frankfurt to the 2018 DFB-Pokal Final, the second in succession for the club, where he beat his future employer, Bayern Munich. With that win, Kovač led Frankfurt to its first trophy since 1988. He finished with a record of 38 wins, 20 draws, and 33 losses in 91 matches. Adi Hütter became his successor.

Bayern Munich (2018–2019)

On 13 April 2018, Bayern Munich announced that Kovač would succeed Jupp Heynckes as manager of the club for the 2018–19 season, with a three-year contract lasting until 30 June 2021. Kovač's brother, Robert, would follow him to Munich to be his assistant coach. Kovač had a contract with Frankfurt until 30 June 2018 and Bayern had to pay a release clause in his contract reported to be around €2.2 million. Kovač is just the fourth former player to manage Bayern Munich after Søren Lerby, Franz Beckenbauer and Jürgen Klinsmann. Kovač was the third Croatian to manage Bayern after Zlatko Čajkovski and Branko Zebec. Kovač officially took over on 1 July 2018 and was presented as the new manager of Bayern Munich on 2 July 2018.

On 12 August, Kovač won his first match as manager of Bayern 5–0 in the German Super Cup against his former club, Eintracht Frankfurt. He won his first Bundesliga game in charge as Bayern defeated 1899 Hoffenheim 3–1 at home on 25 August. On 19 May 2019, he led Bayern to their seventh consecutive Bundesliga title after a 5–1 home win against his former club, Eintracht Frankfurt, beating nearest rivals Borussia Dortmund by two points. This was Kovač's first Bundesliga title as a coach.

On 25 May 2019, Kovač led Bayern to a league and cup double when Bayern defeated RB Leipzig 3–0 in the 2019 DFB-Pokal Final. It was Kovač's second consecutive cup win as he became the first coach since Felix Magath in 2005 and 2006 to win back-to-back cup titles. Kovač also became the first person to win a league and cup double both as a player and coach in German football. On 1 October, Bayern defeated Tottenham Hotspur 7–2 in the Champions League, with Serge Gnabry scoring four goals. It was Bayern's second highest victory in European competitions, only behind their 7–1 victory over Roma in October 2014. On 3 November, Kovač left by mutual agreement after a 5–1 loss to his former club, Eintracht Frankfurt.

Monaco (2020–2022)
On 19 July 2020, Kovač was appointed as head coach at Ligue 1 club Monaco. In his first game as Monaco coach on 23 August, Kovač secured a 2–2 draw after being two goals down against Reims. On 20 November, Monaco beat French champions and Champions League finalists Paris Saint-Germain 3–2 after falling behind 0–2. On 21 February 2021, he defeated Paris Saint-Germain once again, this time 2–0. It was the first time since March 2016 that Monaco won at Parc des Princes. Kovač was subsequently widely praised by French sports media. On 19 May, Monaco lost 2–0 to Paris Saint-Germain in the Coupe de France Final. On 1 January 2022, Monaco announced the departure of Kovač.

VfL Wolfsburg (2022–)
VfL Wolfsburg announced the appointment of Kovač on 24 May 2022 marking his return to the Bundesliga after three years.

Personal life
Kovač was born on 15 October 1971 in Berlin-Wedding, West Berlin, to a Bosnian Croat family hailing from Livno, Bosnia and Herzegovina. His parents Mato and Ivka emigrated from SFR Yugoslavia in 1970. He has two younger siblings, brother Robert and sister Nikolina. Kovač is also a German national and therefore he was eligible to represent Germany, Croatia, and Bosnia and Herzegovina at international level. He opted for Croatia.

Kovač married his primary school sweetheart in 1999. They have a daughter named Laura. Kovač is a Roman Catholic. He generally lives a quiet family life, and considers a family of great value and tries to convey that to his players.

In 2007, Kovač appeared in Croatian Democratic Union (HDZ)'s campaign video for that year's parliamentary election. The video focuses on Croatian diaspora's right to vote despite not living in the country, and depicts Kovač talking about his connection with his homeland. One of the lines from the video, "" (My brother Robert, as well), entered Croatian popular culture and is frequently quoted by the people and the media in the country when referring to the brothers.

Career statistics

Club

International goals

Managerial statistics

Honours

Player
Bayern Munich
Bundesliga: 2002–03
DFB-Pokal: 2002–03
Intercontinental Cup: 2001

Red Bull Salzburg 
Austrian Bundesliga: 2006–07

Manager
Eintracht Frankfurt
DFB-Pokal: 2017–18; runner-up: 2016–17

Bayern Munich
Bundesliga: 2018–19
DFB-Pokal: 2018–19
DFL-Supercup: 2018

Monaco
 Coupe de France runner-up: 2020–21

References

External links

Niko Kovač at Leverkusen Who's Who

1971 births
Living people
Footballers from Berlin
People from Mitte
Croatian footballers
Croatia international footballers
Croatian Roman Catholics
German footballers
German people of Croatian descent
FC Bayern Munich footballers
Bayer 04 Leverkusen players
Hertha BSC players
Hertha Zehlendorf players
Hertha BSC II players
Hamburger SV players
FC Red Bull Salzburg players
2002 FIFA World Cup players
2006 FIFA World Cup players
UEFA Euro 2004 players
UEFA Euro 2008 players
Bundesliga players
2. Bundesliga players
Austrian Football Bundesliga players
Expatriate footballers in Austria
2014 FIFA World Cup managers
Croatian expatriate footballers
Eintracht Frankfurt managers
FC Bayern Munich managers
Bundesliga managers
Association football midfielders
Croatia national football team managers
Croatian expatriate football managers
Croatian expatriate sportspeople in Austria
West German footballers
Croatian expatriate sportspeople in Monaco
German people of Bosnia and Herzegovina descent
AS Monaco FC managers
VfL Wolfsburg managers
German expatriate football managers
German expatriate sportspeople in Austria
German expatriate sportspeople in Monaco
German expatriate footballers